Renato Dehò (12 September 1946 – 1 July 2019) was an Italian professional football player. He was born in Milan.

References

External links
Profile at Inter.it

1946 births
2019 deaths
Italian footballers
Serie A players
Inter Milan players
Calcio Lecco 1912 players
A.C. Monza players
S.S.D. Varese Calcio players
A.C. Ancona players
Association football midfielders